William Henry ("Wee Willie") Dammann (August 9, 1872 – December 6, 1948) was an American left-handed Major League Baseball pitcher. A native of Chicago, he played for three seasons in Major League Baseball, all of them with the Cincinnati Reds. In his three seasons, he went 24–15 in 60 games where, starting 38 games and completing 26 with four shutouts.

On July 9, 1902, Dammann, pitching for the Southern Association's Nashville Baseball Club, pitched a 5-inning no-hitter against the Shreveport Giants at Athletic Park in Nashville.

References

External links
Baseball Reference

1948 deaths
1872 births
19th-century baseball players
American expatriate baseball players in Canada
Major League Baseball pitchers
Cincinnati Reds players
Oregon City (minor league baseball) players
Stockton River Pirates players
Sacramento Senators players
Des Moines Prohibitionists players
Des Moines Indians players
Toledo Swamp Angels players
Terre Haute Hottentots players
Indianapolis Hoosiers (minor league) players
Indianapolis Indians players
Des Moines Hawkeyes players
Marion Glass Blowers players
Nashville Vols players
Kansas City Blues (baseball) players
Spokane Indians players
Vancouver Veterans players
Wichita Jobbers players
Jackson Senators players
Evansville River Rats players
Jackson Convicts players
Grand Rapids Wolverines players
Baseball players from Chicago